1952 Meistaradeildin was the tenth season of Meistaradeildin, the top tier of the Faroese football league system. The championship was contested in a league format, with five teams playing against each other twice. KÍ Klaksvík won its third league title in the season.

Overview

Results

External links
Faroe Islands League Final Tables by webalice.it
Faroese champions by RSSSF

Meistaradeildin seasons
Faroe
Faroe